The 19th season of Taniec z gwiazdami, the Polish edition of Dancing With the Stars, started on 2 September 2016. This is the sixth season aired on Polsat. Krzysztof Ibisz and Paulina Sykut-Jeżyna returned as hosts and Beata Tyszkiewicz, Iwona Pavlović, Michał Malitowski and Andrzej Grabowski returned as judges.

On 4 November, Robert Wabich and his partner Hanna Żudziewicz were crowned the champions.

Couples

Scores

Red numbers indicate the lowest score for each week.
Green numbers indicate the highest score for each week.
 indicates the couple eliminated that week.
 indicates the returning couple that finished in the bottom two or three.
 indicates the couple saved from elimination by immunity.
 indicates the winning couple.
 indicates the runner-up.
 indicates the couple in third place.

Average score chart 
This table only counts for dances scored on a traditional 40-points scale.

Highest and lowest scoring performances 
The best and worst performances in each dance according to the judges' 40-point scale are as follows:

Couples' highest and lowest scoring dances

According to the traditional 40-point scale:

Weekly scores
Unless indicated otherwise, individual judges scores in the charts below (given in parentheses) are listed in this order from left to right: Iwona Pavlović, Andrzej Grabowski, Beata Tyszkiewicz and Michał Malitowski.

Week 1: Season Premiere
Running order

Week 2
Running order

Week 3: Summer Jams
Running order

Week 4: Music Icons
Running order

Week 5: Disney Night
Running order

Week 6: Dedications Night
Running order

Week 7: Radio Hits
Running order

Week 8: Trio Challenge
Running order

Week 9: My Favorite Place (Semi-final)
Running order

Dance-off

Running order

Week 10: Season Finale
Running order

Dance chart
The celebrities and professional partners danced one of these routines for each corresponding week:
Week 1 (Season Premiere): Cha-cha-cha, Waltz, Jive, Tango
Week 2: One unlearned dance (introducing Viennese Waltz, Jazz)
Week 3 (The End of Summer): One unlearned dance (introducing Rumba, Foxtrot, Samba, Salsa, Lambada)
Week 4 (Music Icons Week): One unlearned dance (introducing Paso Doble, Contemporary) and group dances (Freestyle)
Week 5 (Animated Films Week): One unlearned dance (introducing Quickstep)
Week 6 (Dedications Dances): One unlearned dance and one repeated dance
Week 7 (Radio Hits): One unlearned dance and one repeated dance
Week 8 (Trio Challenge): One unlearned dance (trio dances) and one repeated dance (introducing Argentine Tango, Charleston) and group dance (introducing Bollywood) 
Week 9 (Semi-final: My Favorite Place): Two unlearned dances and dance-offs  
Week 10 (Season Final): Rivals' choice and Freestyle and couple's favorite dance of the season

 Highest scoring dance
 Lowest scoring dance
 Performed, but not scored

Call-out order

 This couple came in first place with the judges.
 This couple came in last place with the judges.
 This couple came in last place with the judges and was eliminated.
 This couple was eliminated.
 This couple withdrew from the competition.
 This couple was saved from elimination by immunity.
 This couple won the competition.
 This couple came in second in the competition.
 This couple came in third in the competition.

Guest performances

Rating figures

Notes

References

External links
 

Season 18
2016 Polish television seasons